Heroína is a 1972 Argentine film directed by Raúl de la Torre and starring Graciela Borges, Pepe Soriano, Lautaro Murúa, and María Vaner. The film sold over 78,000 tickets in the first week of release.

Cast
 Graciela Borges as Penny Crespo, a young translator who is undergoing psychoanalysis.
 Pepe Soriano
 Lautaro Murúa
 María Vaner

References

External links
 

1972 films
1970s Spanish-language films
Films directed by Raúl de la Torre
Films about psychoanalysis
1970s Argentine films